William Brady, CM (born 1932) is a Canadian print and radio journalist, manager and executive who has been involved with various local and national organizations.

Early life 
Brady was born in Windsor, Ontario and located to London in the 1950s to work in radio broadcasting. He is regarded as a pioneer of the telephone call-in show in Canada.

Career 
Brady's daily radio program was on the air in the Southwestern Ontario region for more than 20 years. He also hosted a game show called Act Fast on the local television station CFPL-TV.

Beyond his capacity as a radio personality for CFPL radio in London, Brady became more involved in the management of the station, eventually, in 1983 becoming the general manager. He went on to become president of operations for the Blackburn Radio company (owners of CFPL and five other stations) in 1993. Two years later in 1995, Brady was made senior vice-president at the parent Blackburn Group company which also owned the local television station CFPL-TV and The London Free Press daily newspaper. Brady is currently a regular freelance contributor to the op-ed pages of the Free Press.

Brady has served as president of the Central Canada Broadcasters Association, and in 1996 he was inducted into the Canadian Broadcast Hall of Fame.

Brady has also engaged in public service and has been chairman of the board of University Hospital and the London Health Association. He also co-founded and was the first president of Transplant International (Canada) which seeks to expand organ retrieval and transplant awareness. Brady is also vice-president of the board and a member of the executive committee at the John P. Robarts Research Institute (London) and has also been the director at the London Centre for Juvenile Diabetes Research. He has also served as national director of the Canadian Heart Foundation. Brady has been involved in numerous community organizations, often acting as Master of Ceremonies at various fund-raising and testimonial functions.

In 1990 Brady received an honorary Doctor of Laws (LL.D.) from the University of Western Ontario, and in 1991 he was made a Member of the Order of Canada, one of the highest civilian honours the country bestows upon its citizens, for his contributions to the country and community.

Personal life 
The Toronto Star writer Linda Barnard is his daughter.

References

External links 
Bill Brady's biography from the Canadian Communications Foundation.
Details of appointment to the Order of Canada from the Governor General of Canada's website.

1932 births
Living people
Canadian television hosts
Journalists from Ontario
Members of the Order of Canada
People from Windsor, Ontario
Canadian radio journalists
Canadian newspaper journalists
Canadian male journalists